Tolmerus is a genus of robber flies in the family Asilidae. There are about 19 described species in Tolmerus.

Species
These 19 species belong to the genus Tolmerus:

 Tolmerus atripes Loew, 1854 g
 Tolmerus baezi Hradsky & Bosak, 2006 c g
 Tolmerus bolgaricus Lehr, 1981 g
 Tolmerus corsicus Schiner, 1867 g
 Tolmerus eximius Becker, 1923 g
 Tolmerus ferox Becker, 1923 g
 Tolmerus impiger Becker, 1923 g
 Tolmerus incommunis Becker, 1923 g
 Tolmerus lesinensis Palm, 1876 g
 Tolmerus novarensis Schiner, 1868 g
 Tolmerus oromii Hradsky & Bosak, 2006 c g
 Tolmerus paganus Becker, 1923 g
 Tolmerus pauper Becker, 1923 g
 Tolmerus perfectus Becker, 1923 g
 Tolmerus tesselatus (Loew, 1849) g
 Tolmerus trifissilis Seguy, 1929 g
 Tolmerus ventriculus Becker, 1923 g
 Tolmerus vescus b
 Tolmerus weinbergae Hradsky & Bosak, 2006 c g

Data sources: i = ITIS, c = Catalogue of Life, g = GBIF, b = Bugguide.net

References

Further reading

External links

 
 
 

Asilidae
Asilidae genera